Voineasa is a commune located in Vâlcea County, Oltenia, Romania. It is composed of three villages: Valea Măceșului, Voineasa and Voineșița.

Situated on the valley of the Lotru River, the commune is also a spa resort, with a Communist-era hotel dominating the locality, as well as several other tourist facilities. 25 km upstream of the valley is Vidra Lake, one of the largest dams and reservoirs in Romania, built between 1965 and 1972, and also the newly built Transalpina ski resort on lake's shore (Transalpina Resort is not on Transalpina Road but is connected to it by road).

References

Communes in Vâlcea County
Localities in Oltenia
Spa towns in Romania